Speers is a village in the Canadian province of Saskatchewan within the Rural Municipality of Douglas No. 436 and Census Division No. 16. The village is located approximately 50 minutes southeast of the City of North Battleford on Highway 40.

The community is named for Charles Wesley Speers, the colonization agent for Western Canada, who came from Eastern Canada to settle at Griswold, Manitoba, in 1884.

History 
Speers incorporated as a village on December 24, 1915.

Demographics 

See also
 List of communities in Saskatchewan
 Villages of Saskatchewan

References

Villages in Saskatchewan
Douglas No. 436, Saskatchewan
Division No. 16, Saskatchewan